Alice Beach is a resort village in the Canadian province of Saskatchewan within Census Division No. 6. It is on the shores of Last Mountain Lake in the Rural Municipality of Sarnia No. 221.

History 
Alice Beach incorporated as a resort village on July 1, 1983.

Demographics 

Government 
The Resort Village of Alice Beach is governed by an elected municipal council and an appointed administrator that meets on the fourth Monday of every month. The mayor is Ronald Ziegler and its administrator is Darlene Mann.

See also 
List of communities in Saskatchewan
List of municipalities in Saskatchewan
List of resort villages in Saskatchewan
List of villages in Saskatchewan
List of summer villages in Alberta

References

External links 

Resort villages in Saskatchewan
Sarnia No. 221, Saskatchewan
Division No. 6, Saskatchewan